The 2022–23 Danish Superliga (officially the 3F Superliga for sponsorship purposes) is the 33rd season of the Danish Superliga. Copenhagen are the defending champions. The season is currently scheduled to begin on July 15 and scheduled to end in May 2023.

Teams
Vejle and SønderjyskE finished the 2021–22 season in 11th and 12th place, respectively, and were relegated to the 2022–23 1st Division.

The relegated teams were replaced by 2021–22 1st Division Champions AC Horsens and second place Lyngby Boldklub, who both returned after one season's absence.

Stadiums and locations

Personnel and sponsoring
Note: Flags indicate national team as has been defined under FIFA eligibility rules. Players and Managers may hold more than one non-FIFA nationality.

Managerial changes

Regular season

League table

Positions by round

Placement Progression

Results

Results by round

Championship round
Points and goals carried over in full from the regular season.

Positions by round
Below the positions per round are shown. As teams did not all start with an equal number of points, the initial pre-playoffs positions are also given.

Relegation round
Points and goals carried over in full from the regular season.

Positions by round
Below the positions per round are shown. As teams did not all start with an equal number of points, the initial pre-playoffs positions are also given.

European play-offs
The 3rd-placed team of the championship round advances to a play-off match against the winning team of the relegation round. The winners earn a place in the Europa Conference League second qualifying round.

European play-off match

Season statistics

Top scorers and assists

References

External links
 Superliga (uefa.com)
 Soccerway

Danish Superliga seasons
Denmark
Superliga
Current association football seasons